Austen Harry Albu (21 September 1903 – 23 November 1994) was a British Labour Member of Parliament for Edmonton for 25 years.

Personal life 
Albu was born in London in 1903 to Ferdinand and Beatrice Albu. He was educated at Tonbridge School, Kent, and the City and Guilds College.

He married his first wife, Rose Marks, in 1929. They had two sons before her death in 1956. In 1958, he married the Anglo-Austrian social psychologist Marie Jahoda.

Career 
During the 1930s and early 1940s, Albu worked at Aladdin Industries in Greenford. In the later 1940s, he was Deputy President of the Governmental Sub-Commission of the British Control Commission in Germany during the Allied occupation following World War II, where he advocated the establishment of a centrally planned economy for the country, thus favouring the social democratic approach. Returning to Britain in 1947, he was the Deputy Director of the British Institute of Management for a short period until his election to parliament.

Albu first won his Edmonton seat at a by-election in 1948, and held it until his retirement at the February 1974 general election. From 1965 to 1967, he was the Minister of State for Economic Affairs. He later joined the Social Democratic Party (SDP).

He was a Fellow of Imperial College of Science and Technology. He was also a writer of several essays, the most cited being Socialism and the study of man. He is also attributed as one of the authors of New Fabian Essays (1952).

References

External links 

The Papers of Austen Albu held at Churchill Archives Centre
Constituency files of Austen Albu held at London School of Economics' Library Archives and Special Collections

1903 births
1994 deaths
Amalgamated Engineering Union-sponsored MPs
British Jewish writers
Chairs of the Fabian Society
Jewish British politicians
Labour Party (UK) MPs for English constituencies
Ministers in the Wilson governments, 1964–1970
People educated at Tonbridge School
Social Democratic Party (UK) politicians
UK MPs 1945–1950
UK MPs 1950–1951
UK MPs 1951–1955
UK MPs 1955–1959
UK MPs 1959–1964
UK MPs 1964–1966
UK MPs 1966–1970
UK MPs 1970–1974